Synack is an American technology company based in Redwood City, California. The company uses a crowdsourced network of white-hat hackers to find exploitable vulnerabilities and a SaaS platform enabled by AI and machine learning to identify exploitable vulnerabilities. Customers include government agencies and businesses in retail, healthcare and the manufacturing industry.

Overview 
Synack was founded in 2013 by former NSA agents, Jay Kaplan and Mark Kuhr. Synack uses a network of freelance security analysts, or hackers, in over 80 countries to check vulnerability and security problems.

In 2018, Synack worked with US Department of Defense to strengthen the Hack the Pentagon initiative, by vetting ethical hackers for continual assessment of defense websites, hardware and physical systems. In June 2020, the company partnered with DARPA to check for data leakage and buffer errors in their new security prototype developed through the System Security Integration Through Hardware (SSITH) program. In July 2020, the Colorado secretary of state’s office partnered with Synack to conduct penetration tests of its election systems ahead of the presidential vote.

Funding 
Synack is funded by 16 investors. In April 2014, the company announced it had secured Series A funding from Kleiner Perkins Caufield Byers, Google Ventures, Allegis Capital, and Derek Smith of Shape Security. In February 2015, the company raised US$25 million in Series B funding.

In April 2017, it raised $21M from Microsoft Ventures, Hewlett Packard Enterprise, and Singtel and prior investors.

Achievements 
By April 11, 2017, Synack had 100 employees as well as a growing network of freelance hackers.

CNBC named Synack a "CNBC Disruptor" company four times in a row, from 2015 to 2019. In 2019, the company was again named among CNBC Disruptor 50 for Innovative Crowdsourced Security Platform.  According to Bloomberg, Synack is "the most trusted crowdsourced penetration testing platform." It is valued at $500M as of May 2020, as per Fortune Magazine. 

In 2020, the company was featured in America's Most Promising Artificial Intelligence Companies list by Forbes magazine and was also named in Gartner’s Top 25 Enterprise Software Startups.

See also
Security hacker

References

External links
synack.com

2013 establishments in California
American companies established in 2013
Security companies of the United States
Computer security companies
Companies based in Menlo Park, California
Technology companies based in the San Francisco Bay Area